Bettiah  is a city and administrative headquarters of West Champaran district (Tirhut Division) - (Tirhut), near Indo-Nepal border,  north-west of Patna, in Bihar state of India.

Bettiah is known for its famous education system in comparision with other cities in Bihar. The Convent Education of Bettiah plays a major role in this. This provides students of Bettiah to compete with other students and prove that BIHAR is not same everwhere. They make students both academically and morally developed that they establish foundation of success at a very small age.

History

In 1244 A.D., Gangeshwar Dev, a Bhumihar of "Jaitharia" clan, settled at Jaithar in Champaran. One of his descendants, Agar Sen, acquired large territory in the reign of Emperor Jehangir and was bestowed the title of 'Raja' by Emperor Shah Jahan. In 1659, he was succeeded by his son Raja Guj Singh, who built the palace of the family at Bettiah. He died in 1694 A.D. The palace stands today but serves as marketplace.

In 1765, when the East India Company acquired the Diwani, Bettiah Raj held the largest territory under its jurisdiction. It consisted of all of Champaran except for a small portion held by the Ram Nagar Raj (also held by Bhumihar family).

Maharaja Sir Harendra Kishore Singh was the last king of Bettiah Raj. He was born in 1854 and succeeded his father, the late Maharaja Rajendra Kishore Singh Bahadur in 1883. In 1884, he received the title of Maharaja Bahadur as a personal distinction and a Khilat and a sanad from the hands of the Lieutenant Governor of Bengal, Sir Augustus Rivers Thompson. He was created a Knight Commander of the Most Eminent Order of the Indian Empire on 1 March 1889. He was appointed a member of the Legislative Council of Bengal in January 1891. He was also a member of The Asiatic Society. He was the last ruler of Bettiah Raj.  Maharaja Sir Harendra Kishore Singh Bahadur died heirless on 26 March 1893, leaving behind two widows, Maharani Sheo Ratna Kunwar and Maharani Janki Kunwar.
There are a few institutions named after the queen Maharani Janki Kunwar, such as M.J.K College and M.J.K Hospital.
The Bettiah Gharana was one of the oldest style of vocal music. Madhuban was part of the erstwhile 'Bettiah Raj'. Internal disputes and family quarrels divided the Bettiah Raj in course of time. Madhuban Raj was created as a consequence.

A section of Dhrupad singers of Dilli Gharana (Delhi Gharana) from Mughal emperor Shah Jahan’s court had migrated to Bettiah under the patronage of Bettiah Raj and thus was sown the seed of Bettiah Gharana. The famous Dagar brothers had praised the Bettiah Dhrupad singers and some of them were invited to the Bharat Bhavan in Bhopal to perform with other accomplished singers in 1990.

On 26 December 2020, Bettiah became a municipal corporation. It includes Tola San Saraiya, Banuchapar, Kargahiya east and nearby area for its upgradation.

Geography

Climate
The climate of Bettiah is characterised by high temperatures and high precipitation especially during the monsoon season. The Köppen Climate Classification sub-type for this climate is "Cfa" (Humid Subtropical Climate).

Connectivity

Railway

Bettiah is connected to different cities of India through railways. Bettiah railway station is the main railway station serving the city. Direct trains are available to all the major destinations across India like Patna, Delhi, Mumbai, Kolkata, Guwahati, Ahemdabad, Lucknow, Jaipur, Jammu & Katra, etc.

Prajapati Halt railway station, also known as Bettiah Cant Railway station, is another railway station serving the city.

Roadway
National Highway 727 , 139W , 28B, 727aa and State Highway 54 passes through the city.

The National Highway Authority of India (NHAI) has notified a new Patna-Bettiah road as National Highway 139W, setting the state for construction of a high-quality four-lane road between the two towns that would reduce the distance between them to 167 kilometres from the current 200-odd km and travel time to around two hours.

Tola San Saraiyan new town aided village. The new Gopalganj-Bettiah Road passed through this new town aided village. Through this new road a distance of  become shorten for Gopalganj-Bettiah.

A New expressway is constructing via BETTIAH notified by NHAI which links Gorakhpur to Silliguri.

A direct NH is constructing to link Bettiah to Gorakhpur notified as 727aa. NH727AA connects Manuapul (Bettiah), Patzirwa, Paknaha, Pipraghat and Sevrahi in the states of Bihar and Uttar Pradesh.

Airway
The nearest airport in bihar is Jay Prakash Narayan  International Airport located in Patna which is about  via Muzaffarpur and  via areraj.

Demographics
 

As of 2011 Indian Census, Bettiah NP had a total population of 132,209, of which 69,529 were males and 62,680 were females. Population within the age group of 0 to 6 years was 18,995. The total number of literates in Bettiah was 91,298, which constituted 69.1% of the population with male literacy of 72.7% and female literacy of 64.9%. The effective literacy rate of 7+ population of Bettiah was 80.6%, of which male literacy rate was 85.0% and female literacy rate was 75.8%. The Scheduled Castes and Scheduled Tribes population was 8,266 and 828 respectively. Bettiah had 24463 households in 2011.

As per 2011 census, the Bettiah Urban Agglomeration had a total population of 156,200, with 82,663 males and 73,537 females. Population within the age group of 0 to 6 years was 22,067 and the effective literacy (literacy of people above the age of 7) was 80.89. The urban agglomeration includes Bettiah (municipal corporation), Tola Mansaraut (census town), Kargahia Purab (census town) and Hat Saraiya (census town).

On 26 December 2020, Bettiah became a municipal corporation. It included Tola San Saraiya, Banuchapar, Kargahiya east and nearby area for its upgradation. The total population 414,453

Education

Schools
 Alok Bharati Shikshan Sansthan English Medium School, Bettiah
 Amna Urdu High School, Bettiah
 Assembly of God Church School, Bettiah
 Bipin High School, Bettiah
 Delhi Public School, Bettiah
 Jawahar Navoday Vidyalaya, Vrindavan, Bettiah
 Kendriya Vidyalaya, Bettiah
 Khrist Raja High School, Bettiah
 Kidzee Play School, Bettiah
 Krishna International Public School, Bettiah
 National Public Higher Secondary School, Bettiah
 Notre Dame Public School, Bettiah
 Raj Enter Secondary School, Bettiah
 R.L international School, Bettiah
 S.S. Girls High School, Bettiah
 Sacred Heart High School, Bettiah
 Sarsawati Vidya Mandir, Bettiah
 St. Joseph’s School, Bettiah
 St. Mary/Remijius High School, Bettiah
 St. Michael’s Academy. Bettiah
 St. Teresa's Girls' Senior Secondary School, Bettiah
 St. Xavier's Higher Secondary School, Bettiah

Colleges
Government Medical College, Bettiah
Government Engineering College, West Champaran
Government Polytechnic,West Champaran
Maharani Janki Kunwar College, Bettiah
Ram Lakhan Singh Yadav College, Bettiah
Gulab Memorial College, Bettiah
MRRG College, Bettiah
MNM Mahila College, Bettiah
St. Teresa Primary Teachers Training College, Bettiah
Chanakya College of Education, Bettiah
Raj Inter College, Bettiah

Notable people

 Manoj Bajpai, Indian film actor
 Prakash Jha, Indian film producer, director, and screenwriter
 Renu Devi, first female and 7th Deputy Chief Minister of Bihar
 Sanjay Jaiswal, politician and president of Bharatiya Janata Party, Bihar
 Damodar Raao, Indian film Music Director, Singer, Producer, and Lyrics writer
 Krishna Kumar Mishra, former member of Legislative assembly, Chanpatia (Bihar)
 Vikas Mishra, former Vice-Chancellor, Kurukshetra University
 Gopal Singh Nepali, Hindi poet and Bollywood lyricist
 Gauri Shankar Pandey, former member of Legislative assembly, Bettiah (Bihar)
 Kedar Pandey, 14th Chief Minister of Bihar
 Raj Kumar Shukla, Indian independence activist

See also
Bettiah Raj
Bettiah Christians
West Champaran district
List of cities in Bihar
Champaran Satyagraha
Paschim Champaran (Lok Sabha constituency)

References

External links
 West Champaran Information Portal
 Official Website of Tirhut Division
 Galaxy International School Bettiah-GEG Group

 Bettiah City Population Census 2011-2019 | Bihar

Cities and towns in West Champaran district